Russian Dolls: Sex Trade (Dutch: Matroesjka's, meaning Matryoshka doll, also known as Matrioshki or Matrёshki) is a Flemish drama series about a group of women from Lithuania and Russia who are taken to Belgium by a gang involved in the sex trade to work as sex slaves. The series starts in Lithuania, where the girls are chosen and where they have to sign a contract in Greek, which they cannot understand. The gang, under the lead of Ray Van Mechelen, takes the girls to Cyprus and from there they are taken to Club 69 in Belgium to work.

Because of explicit scenes of sex and violence, the program is not appropriate for people under 16 years of age (according to Dutch and Belgian ratings).

General overview
Although based on the problems associated with the sex trade, the series is not so much a documentary or engaged criticism of those problems as it is a source of entertainment. However, director Marc Punt has said that it wouldn't be terrible if the series made people aware of those problems. Already, the series is used to warn women in the former Eastern Bloc of the practices associated with the sex trade.

The program was first broadcast on the Belgian channels Canal+ (now known as "Prime") and VTM. After ten episodes, Russian Dolls received a viewership in excess of 1.1 million. Other countries picked up the show as well. A deal was negotiated between VTM, Independent Productions, and several foreign commercial broadcasters to make a second season. The second season finished shooting in October 2007 and aired in Belgium in 2008. Thus far, the series has twenty episodes.

The British composer David Julyan provided the musical score for the series. The theme song is "Post-Modern Sleaze" by British group Sneaker Pimps. The song from Season 2 Episode 5 playing in Bulgaria is Tazi Vecher by Sonq Nemska.

A second season titled Matrioshki 2 was released in 2007 and continues to deal with human trafficking for prostitution in Europe. The series takes place three years after the first serial, when the traffickers from the first season are released from jail and go to Thailand. This time it deals not only with prostitution of eastern European girls, but also with trafficking of Asian girls brought back for prostitution in Europe, sometimes to help their families.

International broadcasts
The first season can be seen in the following countries: Germany, Turkey, the Netherlands, Great Britain, France, Spain, Bosnia and Herzegovina, Italy, Finland, Sweden, Australia, Russia, Serbia, Brazil, Hungary, Poland, Lithuania, Latvia, Montenegro, Estonia, Albania and Chile. In Portugal it airs on Fox Crime. In Turkey and Italy show airs on FX. In Mexico, the series goes out on Once TV. The Film Zone shows the first ten episodes in some countries from Latin America.

Cast
Peter Van Den Begin - Raymond "Ray" van Mechelen; runs Studio 69.
Eugenia Hirivskaya - Kalinka
Axel Daeseleire - Jan Verplancke
Tom Van Dyck - Vincent Dockx; became paralysed when Ray pushed him, after trying to make Kalinka give him a blowjob. At the end of the first season he died.
Žemyna Ašmontaitė - Daria
Indrė Jaraitė - Inesa
Luk Wyns - Eddy Stoefs; the manager of Studio 69 and is very keen of his money.
Veerle De Jonghe - Esther Van De Walle
Lyudmila Lipner - Debora
Ailika Kremer - Eva
Lyubov Tolkalina - Olga
Marc Van Eeghem - Marc Camps
Stany Crets - Clem De Donder
Lucas Van den Eynde - reporter Nico Maes
Manou Kersting - Danny Bols
Frank Aendenboom - John Dockx; father of Vincent and uncle to Ray. He appears to be the big boss of Studio 69.
Natalya Reva - Inga
Hilde Heijnen - Laura Keyser 
Svetlana Abolenkina - Luna
Zorina Tanasova - Irina
Vilma Raubaitė - Kasandra
Saartje Vandendriessche - Sita
Wim Opbrouck - Mike Simons
Peter Thyssen - Rudi Sierens
Eric Godon - Jean-Paul

The show has also included several guest roles Ludo Hellincx (Nelson Nilis), Karel Deruwe (officer), Jan Decleir (Wim Wilson's father), Chris Lomme (Monique Wilson), and Warre Borgmans (Dokter Van Looy).

Episodes

Season 1

Season 2

References

External links
 
  Article about Matrioshkis 2 in Media-Culture.org
   Article about Matrioshki 2 (in Dutch)
 Filmweb.pl

Flemish television shows
Belgium in fiction
Belgian drama television shows
Prostitution in television
Works about sex trafficking
Works about human trafficking
Human trafficking in Belgium
Works about prostitution in Belgium
Works about organized crime in Belgium
VTM (TV channel) original programming